Oksana Zbrozhek (born 12 January 1978) is a Russian middle distance runner who specializes in the 800 metres.

She won the gold medal at the 2007 European Indoor Championships and the silver medal at the 2009 European Indoor Championships. She also competed at the 2005 European Indoor Championships, but without reaching the final round.

Personal bests
800 metres - 1:58.06 min (2004)
1500 metres - 4:03.86 min (2009, indoor)
Mile run - 4:33.73 min (2005)

See also
List of European Athletics Indoor Championships medalists (women)

References

1978 births
Living people
Russian female middle-distance runners
European Athletics Indoor Championships winners
Russian Athletics Championships winners